The Bone Valley Formation is a geologic formation in Florida. It is sometimes classified as the upper member of the Peace River Formation of the Hawthorn Group. It contains economically important phosphorite deposits that are mined in west-central Florida, as well as rich assemblages of vertebrate fossils.

Lithology
The Bone Valley Formation consists of sandy marl that contains pebbles of phosphate and chert, fragments of bone, and other organic remains. The finer grained material is soft and plastic when wet, but hardens when dry.

Age
The Bone Valley Formation contains mammal fossils and its age has been determined by mammalian biostratigraphy.
Period: Neogene
Epoch: Middle Miocene to Early Pliocene
North American land mammal age: Barstovian to Hemphillian

Paleontology
The Bone Valley Formation includes a diverse assemblage of vertebrate fossils. These include remains of sea turtles, equines, felines, peccaries, and others.

See also

 Bone Valley
 List of fossiliferous stratigraphic units in Florida

References

 

Neogene Florida
Natural history of Florida